Val-du-Layon is a commune in the Maine-et-Loire department of western France. Saint-Lambert-du-Lattay is the municipal seat.

History 
It was established on 31 December 2015 and consists of the former communes of Saint-Aubin-de-Luigné and Saint-Lambert-du-Lattay.

References

See also 
Communes of the Maine-et-Loire department

Valdulayon
States and territories established in 2015